Illsley is a surname. Notable people with the surname include:

Eric Illsley (born 1955), British politician
John Illsley (born 1949), English musician
Leslie Illsley (1936–1989), English artist and sculptor
Mark Illsley (born 1958), American film director

See also
Ilsley (name)